The 2018–19 Premier Limited Overs Tournament was a List A cricket competition that took place in Sri Lanka. It was the eighteenth edition of the Premier Limited Overs Tournament. The tournament ran from 4 to 19 March 2019. Sinhalese Sports Club were the defending champions.

Following the conclusion of the group stage matches, Colombo Cricket Club, Moors Sports Club, Nondescripts Cricket Club, Panadura Sports Club, Ragama Cricket Club, Saracens Sports Club, Sinhalese Sports Club and Sri Lanka Army Sports Club had all progressed to the quarterfinals. Colombo Cricket Club, Moors Sports Club, Saracens Sports Club and Sinhalese Sports Club all won their quarterfinal matches.

In the first semi-final, Sinhalese Sports Club beat Saracens Sports Club by 36 runs, via the Duckworth–Lewis method to advance to the final. They were joined in the final by Colombo Cricket Club, after they beat Moors Sports Club by five wickets. Sinhalese Sports Club retained their title by beating Colombo Cricket Club by seven wickets in the final.

Fixtures

Group A

Group B

Group C

Group D

Quarterfinals

Finals

References

External links
 Series home at ESPN Cricinfo

Districts One Day Tournament
Premier Limited Overs Tournament